James Easley Edmunds II (born July 21, 1970) is an American politician. He has served in the Virginia House of Delegates since 2010, representing the 60th district in Southside Virginia. He is a member of the Republican Party.

Early life and education
Edmunds was born in South Boston, Virginia. He graduated from Halifax County High School in 1988, then received a B.S. degree in business administration from Averett University in 1996.

Political career 
Edmunds has been a member of the Virginia House of Delegates since 2010, representing the 60th district in Southside Virginia, including Charlotte, Halifax, and Prince Edward Counties and part of Campbell County.Edmunds has served on the House committees on Agriculture, Chesapeake and Natural Resources; Counties, Cities and Towns; and Militia, Police and Public Safety.

His first legislation was to legalize possession of shed antlers.

He also serves on the Virginia Tobacco Region Revitalization Commission.

Electoral history
Edmunds was elected to the Halifax County Board of Supervisors from the 5th district in 1999, and became vice chair a year later. He was reelected without opposition in 2003 and 2007.

In 2009, Clarke Hogan, Virginia House of Delegates member from the 60th district, announced he would not run for a fifth term. Edmunds received the Republican nomination and was elected unopposed.

References

External links
 (campaign finance)

1970 births
Living people
Republican Party members of the Virginia House of Delegates
Averett University alumni
People from South Boston, Virginia
American Presbyterians
21st-century American politicians